Galium megalospermum, the Swiss bedstraw or big-seeded bedstraw, is a plant species in the Rubiaceae. It is native to the Alps in Central Europe (eastern France, Switzerland, Austria, southern Germany and northern Italy).

Galium megalospermum is a low-lying plant rarely more than 5 cm tall, forming clumps, very often in narrow places between rocks. Leaves are whorled, usually 6 or 7 per node, egg-shaped, thick and fleshy. Flowers are white to cream-colored, with 4 or 5 petals.

References

External links
Funghi e Fiora in Italia, A.M.I.N.T., Associazione Micologica e Botanica, Galium megalospermum
Photo Botanica, Galium megalospermum All., Gaillet à grosses graines
Botany Czech, svízel / lipkavec, ''Galium megalospermum'
Botanik im Bild  /  Flora von Österreich, Liechtenstein und Südtirol, Schweiz-Labkraut

megalospermum
Flora of Italy
Flora of France
Flora of Switzerland
Flora of Austria
Flora of Sicily
Flora of Germany
Flora of the Alps
Plants described in 1773
Taxa named by Carlo Allioni